Qasemabad-e Aqa (also Romanized as Qāsemābād-e Āqā; also known as Qāsemābād-e Moz̧affarī) is a village in Saidabad Rural District, in the Central District of Savojbolagh County, Alborz Province, Iran. At the 2006 census, its population was 918, in 220 families.

References 

Populated places in Savojbolagh County